Playas de Rosarito Municipality  is located in the northwestern part of the Mexican state of Baja California comprising part of the Tijuana metropolitan area. It lies just south of the city of Tijuana. Its municipal seat is the city of Rosarito. According to the 2020 census, the municipality had a population of 126,890 inhabitants. Its area is 513.32 km² (198.19 sq mi).

History
At the end of the 18th century, Spanish Dominican missionaries and friars gave the name of El Rosario to an indigenous settlement in the area. The town was part of the mission of San Miguel Arcangel de la Frontera, located a few miles to the south. The mission was founded on March 28, 1787 by the Dominican friar Luis Sales on the banks of the San Juan Bautista stream.

Over time, the name of El Rosario became Rosarito. After the Mexican–American War and the Treaty of Guadalupe Hidalgo, the new Mexican border lay no more than 30 km (18.5 miles) from Rosarito. This brought the development of the Rancho de la Tia Juana, which eventually grew into the city of Tijuana, the region's development hub.

Playas de Rosarito means "beaches of Rosarito".

Boroughs
 Primo Tapia
 Plan Libertador

Demographics

As of 2020, the municipality had a total population of 126,890.

As of 2010, the city of Playas de Rosarito had a population of 65,278. Other than the city of Playas de Rosarito, the municipality had 358 localities, the largest of which (with 2010 populations in parentheses) were: Ampliación Ejido Plan Libertador (5,906), Primo Tapia (4,921), classified as urban, and Ciudad Morelos (2,040), Colinas del Sol (1,361), and Santa Anita (1,284), classified as rural.

Other localities 
El Descanso (pop. 567)
Puerto Nuevo (pop. 135)
Santa Anita (pop. 1,284)

References
 Link to tables of population data from the 2005 Census, INEGI: Instituto Nacional de Estadística, Geografía e Informática.
 Playas de Rosarito, Enciclopedia de los Municipios de México, Instituto Nacional Para el Federalismo y el Desarrollo Municipal, SEGOB.  Accessed on line November 15, 2007.

External links

 Ayuntamiento de Playas de Rosarito Official government website.
 Official government tourism office website

 
Municipalities of Baja California